The 2022 Le Gruyère AOP European Curling Championships was held in May and November 2022, to qualify European curling teams for the 2023 World Curling Championships. The A and B division competitions were held from November 18 to 26 at the Östersund Arena in Östersund, Sweden. The C division competition was held from April 30 to May 5 at the Kaunas Ice Palace in Kaunas, Lithuania.

The top eight men's and women's team qualified for the 2023 World Men's Curling Championship and the 2023 World Women's Curling Championship respectively. Sweden, the host of the women's world championship, automatically qualified as one of the eight European entrants. Because of the inaugural Pan Continental Curling Championships, the European Championship have a set number of qualifiers for the World Championships for the first time. As a result, the World Qualification Event has been discontinued.

Medalists

Men

A division

Qualification
The following nations qualified to participate in the 2022 European Curling Championship:

Russian participation
As part of international sports' reaction to the Russian invasion of Ukraine, on September 23, the World Curling Federation made the decision to remove Russian and Belarusian teams from the 2022 European Curling Championships. Because the Russian men's team qualified for the 2022 A Division through the 2021 B Division, their spot was filled by the next placing team in the 2021 B Division, which was Spain.

Teams
The teams are listed as follows:

Round robin standings
Final Round Robin Standings

Round robin results

All draw times are listed in Eastern European Time (UTC+03:00).

Draw 1
Saturday, November 19, 9:00

Draw 2
Saturday, November 19, 19:00

Draw 3
Sunday, November 20, 14:00

Draw 4
Monday, November 21, 8:00

Draw 5
Monday, November 21, 16:00

Draw 6
Tuesday, November 22, 9:00

Draw 7
Tuesday, November 22, 19:00

Draw 8
Wednesday, November 23, 14:00

Draw 9
Thursday, November 24, 8:00

Playoffs

Semifinal 1
Thursday, November 24, 20:00

Semifinal 2
Friday, November 25, 9:00

Bronze medal game
Friday, November 25, 19:00

Gold medal game
Saturday, November 26, 13:00

Player percentages
Round Robin only

Final standings

B division

Teams
The teams are listed as follows:

Round robin standings
Final Round Robin Standings

Relegation round

Semifinals
Friday, November 25, 13:00

Final
Friday, November 25, 19:30

Playoffs

Qualification games
Friday, November 25, 13:00

Semifinals
Friday, November 25, 19:30

Bronze medal game
Saturday, November 26, 9:00

Gold medal game
Saturday, November 26, 9:00

Final standings

C division

Teams
The teams are listed as follows:

Round robin standings
Final Round Robin Standings

Round robin results

All draw times are listed in Eastern European Time (UTC+03:00).

Draw 1
Saturday, April 30, 17:00

Draw 2
Sunday, May 1, 8:00

Draw 4
Sunday, May 1, 16:00

Draw 6
Monday, May 2, 8:00

Draw 8
Monday, May 2, 16:00

Draw 10
Tuesday, May 3, 8:00

Draw 12
Tuesday, May 3, 16:00

Draw 14
Wednesday, May 4, 9:00

Draw 16
Wednesday, May 4, 19:00

Playoffs

Semifinals
Thursday, May 5, 9:30

Bronze medal game
Thursday, May 5, 15:30

Gold medal game
Thursday, May 5, 15:30

Final standings

Women

A division

Qualification
The following nations qualified to participate in the 2022 European Curling Championship:

Russian participation
As part of international sports' reaction to the Russian invasion of Ukraine, on September 23, the World Curling Federation made the decision to remove Russian and Belarusian teams from the 2022 European Curling Championships. Because the Russian women's team qualified for the 2022 A Division, their spot was filled by the next placing team in the 2021 B Division, which was Hungary.

Teams
The teams are listed as follows:

Round robin standings
Final Round Robin Standings

Round robin results

All draw times are listed in Eastern European Time (UTC+03:00).

Draw 1
Friday, November 18, 20:00

Draw 2
Saturday, November 19, 14:00

Draw 3
Sunday, November 20, 9:00

Draw 4
Sunday, November 20, 19:00

Draw 5
Monday, November 21, 12:00

Draw 6
Monday, November 21, 20:00

Draw 7
Tuesday, November 22, 14:00

Draw 8
Wednesday, November 23, 9:00

Draw 9
Wednesday, November 23, 19:00

Playoffs

Semifinal 1
Thursday, November 24, 12:00

Semifinal 2
Thursday, November 24, 16:00

Bronze medal game
Friday, November 25, 14:00

Gold medal game
Saturday, November 26, 9:00

Player percentages
Round Robin only

Final standings

B division

Teams
The teams are listed as follows:

Round robin standings
Final Round Robin Standings

Playoffs

Semifinals
Friday, November 25, 19:30

Bronze medal game
Saturday, November 26, 9:00

Gold medal game
Saturday, November 26, 9:00

Final standings

C division

Teams
The teams are listed as follows:

Round robin standings
Final Round Robin Standings

Round robin results

All draw times are listed in Eastern European Time (UTC+03:00).

Draw 3
Sunday, May 1, 12:00

Draw 5
Sunday, May 1, 20:00

Draw 7
Monday, May 2, 12:00

Draw 9
Monday, May 2, 20:00

Draw 11
Tuesday, May 3, 12:00

Draw 13
Tuesday, May 3, 20:00

Draw 15
Wednesday, May 4, 14:00

Playoffs

Semifinals
Thursday, May 5, 9:30

Bronze medal game
Thursday, May 5, 15:30

Gold medal game
Thursday, May 5, 15:30

Final standings

References

External links
 (A division)
 (B division)
  (A division, men)
  (A division, women)
  (B division, men)
  (B division, women)
  (C division, men)
  (C division, women)

European Curling Championships
European Curling Championships
International sports competitions hosted by Lithuania
European Curling Championships
European Curling Championships
Curling competitions in Lithuania
International curling competitions hosted by Sweden
European Curling Championships
Sports competitions in Östersund
Sports competitions in Kaunas
European Curling Championships
European Curling Championships